The 2011 Tour of the Basque Country, was the 51st running of the Tour of the Basque Country cycling stage race. It started on 4 April in Zumarraga and ended on 9 April in Zalla and consisted of six stages, including a race-concluding individual time trial. It was the eighth race of the 2011 UCI World Tour season.

The race was won by  rider Andreas Klöden, who claimed the leader's yellow jersey for the second time – having previously won the race in 2000 – with a second-place finish on the final time trial stage. Klöden had also led the race after stage two, having finished second on the stage; one of three second place stage finishes that Klöden achieved during the week. Klöden's winning margin over his team-mate and runner-up Chris Horner was 47 seconds, and 's Robert Gesink completed the podium, also 47 seconds down on Klöden, but behind Horner on countback.

In the race's other classifications, Klöden's consistent high finishes earned him the white jersey for amassing the highest number of points at stage finishes,  rider Michael Albasini won the King of the Mountains classification, Bram Tankink of  won the blue jersey for the sprints classification, with  finishing at the head of the teams classification.

Teams
As the Tour of the Basque Country was part of the 2011 UCI World Tour, all 18 UCI ProTeams were invited automatically and obligated to attend.

The full list of participating teams was:

 
 
 
 Caja Rural

Race previews and favourites
2010 race winner Chris Horner was a favourite and had  teammate, and 2000 winner Andreas Klöden to help him. Other heavy contenders included Ivan Basso as he prepared for the 2011 Tour de France, Damiano Cunego and Robert Gesink. Samuel Sánchez had hopes in redeeming himself after a split in the peloton ruined his chance of victory in 2010, warming up for the race by taking the GP Miguel Induráin one-day race two days before the start of the Tour. Fränk Schleck was also expected to do well after winning Critérium International and his brother Andy was also a part of the  squad in the Basque Country.

Stages

Stage 1
4 April 2011 – Zumarraga to Zumarraga,

Stage 2
5 April 2011 – Zumarraga to Lekunberri,

Stage 3
6 April 2011 – Villatuerta to Zuia,

Stage 4
7 April 2011 – Amurrio to Eibar,

Stage 5
8 April 2011 – Eibar to Zalla,

Stage 6
9 April 2011 – Zalla, individual time trial (ITT)

Classification leadership table
In the Tour of the Basque Country, four different jerseys were awarded. For the general classification, calculated by adding each cyclist's finishing times on each stage, the leader received a yellow jersey. This classification was considered the most important of the Tour of the Basque Country, and the winner was considered the winner of the race itself.

Additionally, there was a points classification, which awarded a white jersey. In the points classification, cyclists received points for finishing in the top fifteen in a stage. The stage win awarded 25 points, second place awarded 20 points, third 16, fourth 14, fifth 12, sixth 10 and one point fewer per place down the line, to a single point for fifteenth.

There was also a mountains classification, which awarded a red jersey. In the mountains classification, points were won by reaching the top of a mountain before other cyclists. All climbs were categorised, first, second, or third-category, with more points available for the higher-categorised climbs.

The fourth jersey represented the sprints classification, which awarded a blue jersey. In the sprint classification, cyclists received points for being one of the first three in intermediate sprints, with three points awarded for first place, two for second, and one for third.

References

2011
2011 UCI World Tour
2011 in Spanish road cycling